Castelvetere may refer to a pair of Italian municipalities of Campania:

Castelvetere in Val Fortore, in the Province of Benevento
Castelvetere sul Calore, in the Province of Avellino

See also 
Castelvecchio Subequo, Italian commune in the Abruzzo region, named Castelvetere in the Middle Ages
Caulonia, Italian municipality of Calabria, named Castelvetere until 1863